The 2022 season was Molde's 15th consecutive year in Eliteserien, and their 46th season in the top flight of Norwegian football. Molde finished the season as Champions of the Eliteserien and the 2021–22 Norwegian Cup, progressed to the Fourth Round of the 2022–23 Norwegian Cup, and were knocked out of the Europa Conference League in the group stage after finishing 3rd behind Djurgårdens and Gent, but ahead of Shamrock Rovers.

Season events
On 15 December 2021, Molde announced that Jacob Karlstrøm would join the club on 1 January 2022 on a contract until the end of the 2025 season from Tromsø.

On 17 January, Molde announced the signing of Markus Kaasa to a four-year contract from Odd.

On 24 January, Johan Bakke signed for Molde on a three-year contract from Sogndal.

On 2 February, Molde announced the signing of Benjamin Hansen to a three-year contract from Haugesund.

On 4 February, Molde extended their contract with Erling Moe until the end of 2023, and with Rafik Zekhnini until the end of 2024.

On 7 February, Molde announced return of Eirik Haugan on a one-year contract from Östersunds.

On 2 August, Molde announced the signing of Kristian Eriksen on a contract until 2026, from HamKam.

On 13 September, Eirik Haugan extended his contract with Molde until the end of 2026.

On 7 October, Magnus Wolff Eikrem signed a new three year deal with the club, extending his contract with Molde until the end of 2025.

On 8 October, Mathias Løvik signed a new contract with Molde until the end of the 2026 season.

On 28 October, Kristoffer Haugen extended his contract with Molde until the end of 2025.

Squad

Transfers

In

Out

Loans out

Released

Friendlies

Competitions

Overview

Eliteserien

Results summary

Results by match

Results

Table

Norwegian Cup

2021–22

Final

2022–23

Progressed to the Fourth round which took place in the 2023 season.

Europa Conference League

Qualifying rounds

Group stage

Squad statistics

Appearances and goals

|-
|colspan="14"|Players away from Molde on loan:
|-
|colspan="14"|Players who appeared for Molde no longer at the club:
|}

Goal scorers

Clean sheets

Disciplinary record

See also
Molde FK seasons

References

2022
Molde
Molde
Norwegian football championship-winning seasons